Yasutomo Kubo (久保 康友, born August 6, 1980 in Kashihara, Nara) is a Japanese former professional baseball pitcher. He previously played for the Chiba Lotte Marines from 2005 to 2008, the Hanshin Tigers from 2009 to 2013, and the Yokohama DeNA BayStars from 2014 to 2017. In 2018, he played for the Sugar Land Skeeters of the Atlantic League of Professional Baseball. In 2019, he played in the Mexican League for the Bravos de León.

Career

Chiba Lotte Marines
Kubo began his professional career with the Chiba Lotte Marines of Nippon Professional Baseball. He made his NPB debut on April 2, 2005. Kubo then went on to play for the Marines through the 2008 season.

Hanshin Tigers
In 2009, Kubo joined the Hanshin Tigers of NPB. He played for the team in the 2009, 2010, 2011, 2012, and 2013 seasons before becoming a free agent after 2013.

Yokohama DeNA BayStars
Kubo joined the Yokohama DeNA BayStars of NPB for the 2014 season. He played for the team through the 2017 season before becoming a free agent at the end of the year.

Gary SouthShore RailCats
On April 19, 2018, Kubo signed with the Gary SouthShore RailCats of the American Association of Independent Professional Baseball. He was released by Gary on May 11, but re-signed on June 28. In 3 games with Gary, Kubo recorded a 4.05 ERA with 4 strikeouts in 6.2 innings.

Sugar Land Skeeters
On July 13, 2018, Kubo was traded to the Sugar Land Skeeters of the Atlantic League of Professional Baseball. He finished the year with the Skeeters, pitching in 13 games and posting a 5-2 record and 5.14 ERA. He became a free agent after the season.

Bravos de León
On April 3, 2019, Kubo signed with the Bravos de León of the Mexican League. He spent the 2019 season with the club and logged an 8-14 record and 5.98 ERA while leading the league with 154 strikeouts. Kubo was released on January 13, 2020.

References

External links

NPB stats

1980 births
Living people
Bravos de León players
Chiba Lotte Marines players
Hanshin Tigers players
Japanese expatriate baseball players in Mexico
Japanese expatriate baseball players in the United States
Kansai University alumni
Mexican League baseball pitchers
Nippon Professional Baseball pitchers
Nippon Professional Baseball Rookie of the Year Award winners
Baseball people from Nara Prefecture
People from Kashihara, Nara
Sugar Land Skeeters players
Yokohama DeNA BayStars players